Just Cause is a Canadian legal drama television series produced by Mind's Eye Entertainment. Filming was done in Vancouver, British Columbia but the series is set in San Francisco, California.

Plot
Five years ago, Alexandra DeMonaco (Elizabeth Lackey) went to prison for a crime she didn't commit. Unaware that her no-good husband was running a medical insurance scam, she became a scapegoat for a publicity-hungry District Attorney, while her husband disappeared with five million dollars and their daughter.

Instead of wasting time on self-pity while incarcerated, Alex goes to law school on the internet and gets her law degree. Now out on parole, she has two goals: to find her daughter and to become a lawyer. But a convicted felon can't practice law. So Alex goes to Hamilton Whitney III (Richard Thomas), a successful, well-respected San Francisco attorney, who also happens to be a friend of the governor. Alex wants Whitney to help her petition the governor for a pardon. To pay her way, she goes to work in Whitney's law firm as an office assistant. Her sassy, brash personality bumps hard against Whitney's stuffy, reserved Waspyness, and their relationship is not always smooth.

Their view of the law is different as well. Whitney is more interested in how much his well-heeled clients are willing to pay, while Alex is determined to use the law to help people like herself who have been abandoned by the system. Gradually Alex's idealism wins Whitney over. Now they work together to champion underdog cases and achieve justice for the less powerful.

Cast
Elizabeth Lackey as Alexandra DeMonacco
Richard Thomas as Hamilton Whitney III
Shaun Benson as Patrick Heller
Khaira Ledeyo as Peggy Tran
Mark Hildreth as Ted Kasselbaum
Jason Schombing as Dave Kaplan
Roger R. Cross as C.J. Leon

Episodes

Awards and nominations
Helen Shaver won a Gemini Award for Best Director in a Dramatic Series for her work on the episode "Death's Details", and Richard Schwadel won the Leo award for Best Picture Editing on the episode "Above the Law".

Additionally, it was nominated for another Gemini and Leo, and a Directors Guild of Canada award.

References

External links
 

2002 Canadian television series debuts
2003 Canadian television series endings
2000s Canadian crime drama television series
Canadian legal television series
English-language television shows
PAX TV original programming
Television shows set in San Francisco